Sands China Limited is an integrated resort developer and operator in Macau and a majority-owned subsidiary of Las Vegas Sands Corporation.

Properties
Sands China mainly operates in six segments in Macau: The Venetian Macao, Sands Macao, The Plaza Macao, The Londoner Macao, The Parisian Macao, ferry and other operations. Its business involves gaming areas, meeting space, convention and exhibition halls, retail and dining areas and entertainment venues.

References

External links
 
 

Gambling companies of Macau
Gambling companies established in 2009
Hospitality companies established in 2009
2009 initial public offerings